Tristan Le Govic is a Breton harp player, singer and composer born in 1976.

His repertoire combines traditional tunes from the Celtic nations, together with original compositions in a contemporary style played on the Celtic harp.

Presentation 

Born in Brittany, Tristan Le Govic was only seven years old when he started learning the Celtic harp at the Plœmeur Conservatoire of Traditional Music. The attraction to music will never leave him.

During his studies he gained numerous prizes and nominations that emphasize the recognition of a talented and accomplished musician. Performing on international stages, critics pronounce him as one of the leading Celtic harpers.

His inspiration comes from the heart of music, poetry, real or imaginary legends, as well as nature or daily – but never innocent – impressions. Rhythm and Harmony are the musical predominant elements in his music. In perpetual movement, his world opens the gates of an extraordinary diversity.

Comments have acclaimed: "The magic of his harp", "His virtuosity", "His exceptional musicality", "The grace of his technique". His concerts are described as being a moment of intense emotion. For the public, he is an enchanter.

Studies 

 2005 – National Diploma of teaching music. Cefedem of Brittany.
 2002 – Master of Music. University of Rennes 2.
 2000 – Certificate of music writing. Conservatoire of Nantes.
 1998 – DEM (Diploma of music studies). Conservatoire of Rennes
 1998 – Gold medal in Celtic Harp. Conservatoire of Rennes
 1998 – Gold medal in Chamber Music. Conservatoire of Rennes
 1996 – Diploma of Music Theory. Conservatoire of Rennes
 1994 – Baccalauréat D (mathematic & biology).

Awards 

 2007 – Lowland & Border Pipers’ society. Edinburgh, 1st prize, in duet with Jean-Luc Lefaucheur.
 2007 – Danny Kyle Open Stage. Celtic Connections – Glasgow, "Highly Recommended" nomination.
 1999 – Music Competition. Epinal, 1st prize unanimously.
 1998 – International of UFAM. Paris, 1st prize unanimously.
 1998 – European Music competition. Montdidier, 1st prize unanimously.
 1995 – Kan ar Bobl. Pontivy, 1st prize unanimously.

Discography 

 2014 – Tristan Le Govic, Elva (TD03).
 2009 – Tristan Le Govic, Awen (TD02).
 2006 – Tristan Le Govic, Dasson ur Galon (TD01).
 2004 – Telenn – Harpe Celtique, l’Anthologie vol.1 (Coop-breizh).

Publications, Music Books 

 2015 – Antologiezh Telenn Breizh (Breton Harp Anthology), vol. 1, 2, 3.
 2010 – Ailie Robertson, Scottish Harp Anthology, vol. 1, 2, 3.
 2009 – Tristan Le Govic, Awen.
 2008 – Tristan Le Govic, Island.
 2008 – Tristan Le Govic, Dasson ur Galon.
 2001 – CRIHC, L’Anthologie de la Harpe, la Harpe des Celtes''.

External links 
   
 Tristan Le Govic Trio : http://trio.tristanlegovic.eu  
 CelticHarpBlog : http://www.celticharpblog.com  

Musicians from Lorient
1976 births
French harpists
Folk harpists
Traditional musicians
Living people
Rennes 2 University alumni